Public School 108 is a historic school building located in Cypress Hills, Brooklyn, New York, New York. It was designed by James W. Naughton and built in 1895. It is a three-story, brick building trimmed in Lake Superior sandstone in the Romanesque Revival style.  It has an attic fourth floor pierced by dormer windows.  It consists of a seven bay central section connected to three bay wide end pavilions by recessed wings.

It was listed on the National Register of Historic Places in 1982. The building continues to house an elementary school, now known as P.S. 108 Sal Abbracciamento School.

See also 
List of New York City Landmarks
National Register of Historic Places listings in Kings County, New York

References

Cypress Hills, Brooklyn
School buildings on the National Register of Historic Places in New York City
Public elementary schools in Brooklyn
New York City Designated Landmarks in Brooklyn
Romanesque Revival architecture in New York City
School buildings completed in 1895
National Register of Historic Places in Brooklyn